Playford A power station was the first power station built by the Electricity Trust of South Australia at Port Paterson, South Australia near Port Augusta in South Australia. It was built in 1954 to generate electricity from coal mined from the Telford Cut at Leigh Creek and transported  by rail.

It was joined by the Playford B Power Station in 1963, and the Northern Power Station in 1985.

The first unit of the power station was opened by Governor Robert George on 23 July 1954. It was the first power station in South Australia which did not require the importation of fuel from interstate. It was expected to take a few years before all six units were operational. The life of Playford A and B stations was expected to be 30 years, the supply of coal then known to be available from Leigh Creek. Playford A was decommissioned in 1985, however the building remained until all three power stations were demolished in 2018.

Flinders Power, a division of Alinta Energy, contracted out the demolition of all three power stations and remediating the site. The demolition and 1068ha site rehabilitation was completed in May 2019.

See also

 Alinta Energy
 Northern Power Station

References

External links
 ABC News - Explosion collapses chimney of old Port Augusta power station
 NoFingerPrints.net - Photos inside Northern & Playford Power Stations 

Coal-fired power stations in South Australia
Far North (South Australia)
Former power stations in Australia
Port Augusta
Buildings and structures demolished in 2018
Demolished buildings and structures in South Australia